Raymond Herman Poole (January 16, 1920 – March 1, 2006) was an American professional baseball player whose career extended for ten seasons (1941; 1946–1954). A native of Salisbury, North Carolina, he attended Catawba College in his home city. Poole served in the United States Army during World War II from 1942 to 1945.

During his brief Major League career, Poole never appeared in the field. In his 15 MLB games as a pinch hitter (two in 1941 and 13 in 1947) he recorded 16 plate appearances and 15 at bats with one base on balls and three hits, all singles. He scored one run and drove in one run as well.  Much of his minor league career occurred at the Class B level, in the Piedmont and Southeastern Leagues.

References

External links

1920 births
2006 deaths
Baseball players from North Carolina
Danville Leafs players
Lancaster Red Roses players
Major League Baseball outfielders
Montgomery Rebels players
People from Salisbury, North Carolina
Philadelphia Athletics players
Richmond Colts players
St. Petersburg Saints players
Savannah Indians players
Vicksburg Billies players
Waterloo White Hawks players
United States Army personnel of World War II
United States Army soldiers